is a railway station in the city of Ueda, Nagano, Japan, operated by the private railway operating company Ueda Electric Railway.

Lines
Nakano Station is served by the Bessho Line and is 8.5 kilometers from the terminus of the line at Ueda Station.

Station layout
The station consists of one ground-level side platforms serving a single bi-directional track. The station is not attended.

History
The station opened on 17 June 1921.

Station numbering was introduced in August 2016 with Nakano being assigned station number BE12.

Passenger statistics
In fiscal 2015, the station was used by an average of 43 passengers daily (boarding passengers only).

Surrounding area
The station is now located in a depopulated rural area with few houses or buildings nearby.

See also
 List of railway stations in Japan

References

External links

 

Railway stations in Japan opened in 1921
Railway stations in Nagano Prefecture
Ueda Electric Railway
Ueda, Nagano